See also 1995 in birding and ornithology, main events of 1996 and 1997 in birding and ornithology

Worldwide
 41 Northern bald ibises, a fifth of the known world population, die in Morocco of unknown causes.

New species
See also Bird species new to science described in the 1990s

 The cryptic warbler (Cryptosylvicola randrianasoloi) from Madagascar is first described.

Taxonomic developments
To be completed

Ornithologists

Deaths
 21 May - Bobby Tulloch (born 1929)

Europe

Britain

Breeding birds
 The only breeding pair of golden eagles in England hatch a chick for the first time in three years at Haweswater.
 580 singing male corncrakes are counted, up from 537 in 1995.
 The first inland breeding of avocets in modern times takes place at a site in London. However breeding success at coastal colonies in East Anglia is poor.
 A pair of hoopoes successfully breed in Mid Wales.

Migrant and wintering birds
 Thousands of waxwings are seen across Britain in the first few months of the year.
 Large numbers of little stints and curlew sandpipers pass through during the autumn.

Rare birds
 A second-calendar year south polar skua (Stercorarius maccormicki) was at West Bexington, Dorset from 27 January to 4 February 1996. The species nests on the Antarctic continent, and during the non-breeding season covers large distances, including as far as the northern oceans. It was added to the British list in August 2021.
 A redhead in Nottinghamshire in March is Britain's first
 An American coot at Stodmarsh, Kent in April is Britain's first
 An indigo bunting on Ramsey Island, Pembrokeshire in October is Britain's first
 A cedar waxwing in Nottingham in February is Britain's second, but the first to be seen by large numbers of observers
 A great knot on Teesside in October is Britain's second, but the first to be seen by large numbers of observers
 A Caspian plover in Shetland in June is Britain's fourth
 A calandra lark on the Isles of Scilly in April is Britain's fifth
 During October, the Isles of Scilly also hosted two black-and-white warblers and Britain's sixth buff-bellied pipit
 A Spanish sparrow arrives in Cumbria in July to begin a year-long stay; few observers had seen this species in Britain previously
 The influx of Arctic redpolls of the race exilipes which began in late 1995 continued, and became the largest recorded invasion of this species into the country

Other events
 Thousands of seabirds are killed by an oil spill when the Sea Empress oil tanker runs aground in Pembrokeshire in February.
 A trial cull of ruddy ducks takes place in the Midlands.
 At Rutland Water a project to reintroduce ospreys begins.
 The British Birdwatching Fair the Vietnamese pheasant as its theme.

France
Europe's first great blue heron on Ile d'Ouessant, Finistère in April.

Ireland
 A long-toed stint at Ballycotton, County Cork in June is the first for Ireland.

Scandinavia
To be completed

North America
To be completed

Asia
 Four Siberian white cranes arrive at Bharatpur in India, the first records of this highly endangered species there since the 1992/1993 winter.

References

Birding and ornithology
Birding and ornithology by year
Ornithology